Domala is a village in the Narowal District of Punjab province of Pakistan.  It is located at 32°9'0N 74°49'0E with an altitude of 238 metres (784 feet). Neighbouring settlements include Chida, Gangor and Nonar.

References

Villages in Narowal District